John Henry Keeley (born 27 July 1961) is an English former footballer who played as a goalkeeper. He was most recently the goalkeeping coach at Ipswich Town.

Playing career
Born in Plaistow, Essex, Keeley began his career at Southend United. He made 63 first team appearances between 1979 and 1986. He was signed by Brighton in 1986 and made 138 league appearances in four years with the club, helping the club to promotion to the Second Division in 1988. He joined Oldham Athletic in 1990, but made only two league appearances, being loaned out to Oxford United, Reading and Chester City in 1991 and 1992. He joined Colchester United in 1993, making 15 league appearances. On 16 October 1993, Colchester United became the first League club to have both keepers sent off in a game against Hereford United. John Keeley and Nathan Munson were both dismissed for professional fouls as the U's slumped to a 5–0 defeat. He subsequently joined Stockport County, making 20 league appearances. He later played for Peterborough United before retiring from the professional game.

Coaching career
After retiring from playing, Keeley joined Portsmouth as an academy coach in 2007. He worked in Portsmouth's academy for three years before becoming the goalkeeping coach for the first-team in 2010. He left his role at Portsmouth in 2013. Keeley worked as a goalkeeper coach at Blackburn Rovers, Brighton & Hove Albion and Chinese club Guangzhou R&F before returning to Portsmouth in 2016, becoming part of Paul Cook's coaching staff. After leaving Portsmouth at the end of the 2020–21 season, he was reunited with Paul Cook after joining the Ipswich Town coaching staff as goalkeeping coach. Keeley left the club in December 2021 following the sacking of Cook as manager.

Honours
Brighton & Hove Albion
 Football League Third Division runner-up: 1987–88

Stockport County
 Football League Division Two playoff runner-up: 1993–94

Individual
Brighton & Hove Albion Player of the Year: 1988–89

References

External links

Since 1888... The Searchable Premiership and Football League Player Database (subscription required)

1961 births
Living people
Footballers from Plaistow, Newham
English footballers
Association football goalkeepers
Southend United F.C. players
Brighton & Hove Albion F.C. players
Oldham Athletic A.F.C. players
Oxford United F.C. players
Reading F.C. players
Chester City F.C. players
Colchester United F.C. players
Stockport County F.C. players
Peterborough United F.C. players
Chelmsford City F.C. players
Worthing F.C. players
English Football League players
Premier League players
Portsmouth F.C. non-playing staff
Blackburn Rovers F.C. non-playing staff
Brighton & Hove Albion F.C. non-playing staff
Guangzhou City F.C. non-playing staff
Ipswich Town F.C. non-playing staff
Association football goalkeeping coaches